Adaina microdactoides is a moth of the family Pterophoridae. It is known from Luzon and Mindanao in the Philippines.

The wingspan is 13–14 mm. Adults are on wing in August and November.

References

Oidaematophorini
Moths described in 2003